Moor End may refer to two places in England:

Moor End, County Durham, an area of Belmont parish
Moor End, Buckinghamshire, a hamlet in Lane End parish

See also 
Moor (disambiguation)